The 1920–21 Michigan Wolverines men's basketball team represented the University of Michigan in intercollegiate college basketball during the 1920–21 season. Arthur Karpus served as team captain. On January 29, 1921, the team began a 14-game winning streak against the  that continued through a January 6, 1922, victory over Michigan State University, which was at the time known as Michigan Agricultural college. This stood as the longest winning streak in school history until 1985. The team was also involved in setting the longest road winning streaks at the time. It won on January 22, 1921, against  ending a 7-game road winning streak that had started on December 27, 1920, against the Louisville YMCA. Then on January 29, the team started another 7-game road winning streak against Chicago that lasted until a December 17, 1921, victory at Case. These two 7-game streaks stood as the school road winning streak record until 1985.

Schedule

Players
R. Jerome Dunne, Chicago, Illinois - center and varsity letter winner
R. Gregory - aMa letter winner
Arthur Karpus, Grayling, Michigan - forward, captain, and varsity letter winner
Kenneth B. LeGalley - guard and varsity letter winner
George W. "Bill" Miller - forward and varsity letter winner
Robert S. Peare, Rockville, Indiana
Charles L. Pearman, Verona, New York - aMa letter winner
William J. Piper, Calumet, Michigan - aMa letter winner
Walter B. "Bud" Rea, Erie, Pennsylvania - guard and varsity letter winner
Rex G. Reason, Detroit, Michigan
Howard Elmer Rowse, Detroit, Michigan
Raymond W. Walmoth, Detroit, Michigan - aMa letter winner
Benjamin Weiss, Newark, New Jersey - center and varsity letter winner
Robert C. Whitlock, Detroit, Michigan - forward and varsity letter winner
Frederick B. Wickham, Norwalk, Ohio - aMa letter winner
Jack G. Williams, Detroit, Michigan - guard and varsity letter winner
Lincoln B. Wilson, Chicago, Illinois - aMa letter winner
Bernard F. Zinn, Huntington, Indiana - aMa letter winner

Scoring statistics

The scoring statistics do not include six games of Southern tour.

Coaching staff
E. J. Mather - coach
Boyd H. Logan - manager

References

Michigan
Michigan Wolverines men's basketball seasons
Michigan Wolverines basketball
Michigan Wolverines basketball